= Liz Beddoe =

New Zealand social work academic

Elizabeth Beddoe
- Education: Deakin University
- Scientific career
- Fields: Social work
- Workplaces: University of Auckland
- Thesis: Building professional capital : New Zealand social workers and continuing education (2010)

Elizabeth 'Liz' Beddoe is a New Zealand social work academic, and as of 2019 is a full professor at the University of Auckland.

== Academic career ==
After completing a 2010 PhD titled 'Building professional capital: New Zealand social workers and continuing education' at Deakin University, Beddoe rose to full professor at the University of Auckland.

Beddoe was a founding member of the Social Workers Registration Board.

Liz Beddoe has published and written on hundreds of scholarly articles since the late 1980s. Two of her most recents works published in 2025 include "Dealing with the unexpected in research" and "Resisting the new conservatism: Social work and the social justice imperative."

== Selected works ==
- Davys, Allyson, and Liz Beddoe. Best practice in professional supervision: A guide for the helping professions. Jessica Kingsley Publishers, 2010.
- Beddoe, Liz. "Surveillance or reflection: Professional supervision in ‘the risk society’." British Journal of Social Work 40, no. 4 (2010): 1279-1296.
- McCann, Clare M., Elizabeth Beddoe, Katie McCormick, Peter Huggard, Sally Kedge, Carole Adamson, and Jayne Huggard. "Resilience in the health professions: A review of recent literature." International Journal of Wellbeing 3, no. 1 (2013).
- Beddoe, Liz. "External supervision in social work: Power, space, risk, and the search for safety." Australian Social Work 65, no. 2 (2012): 197–213.
- Adamson, Carole, Liz Beddoe, and Allyson Davys. "Building resilient practitioners: Definitions and practitioner understandings." British Journal of Social Work 44, no. 3 (2012): 522–541.
